RT23 may refer to:

RT-23 Molodets, Soviet intercontinental ballistic missile
Ralt RT23, 1991 Australian racing car